(born September 18, 1977 in Lima, Peru) is a Japanese Peruvian retired football player.

International career
Soria made five appearances for the Peru national football team during 2000.

References

External links
 
 David Soria at Peru Futbol

1977 births
Living people
Footballers from Lima
Peruvian people of Japanese descent
Association football midfielders
Peruvian footballers
Peru international footballers
Hokkaido Consadole Sapporo players
Sporting Cristal footballers
Coronel Bolognesi footballers
Club Deportivo Universidad César Vallejo footballers
Total Chalaco footballers
Sport Áncash footballers
Peruvian Primera División players
Peruvian expatriate footballers
Expatriate footballers in Japan